Richard Mott (July 21, 1804 – January 22, 1888) was mayor of Toledo, Ohio, and a two-term U.S. Representative from Ohio from 1855 to 1859.

Biography
Born to Quaker parents in Mamaroneck, New York, Mott attended a Quaker boarding school and seminary in Dutchess County, New York. In 1815, he moved with his parents to New York City, in 1818 became a clerk in a store, and in 1824 engaged in banking. He moved to Toledo, Ohio, in 1836 and engaged in the real estate business and other enterprises. He assisted in building the first railroad west of Utica, from Toledo to Adrian, and served as mayor of Toledo in 1845 and 1846.

Mott was a Democrat in politics until 1848, when he entered actively into the antislavery movement. He was elected as an Opposition Party candidate to the Thirty-fourth and reelected as a Republican to the Thirty-fifth Congresses (March 4, 1855 - March 3, 1859). He was not a candidate for renomination in 1858. He returned to Toledo, and engaged in banking and the real estate business. He served as chairman of the citizens' military committee during the Civil War. Mott was also an advocate of woman suffrage.

Death
He died in Toledo on January 22, 1888. He was interred in Mount Hope Cemetery in Rochester, New York.

Family
He was the brother of James Mott and brother-in-law of the American female agitator, Lucretia Mott and brother-in-law to abolitionist Lindley Murray Moore.

Notes

References
 
 
Attribution

1804 births
1888 deaths
People from Mamaroneck, New York
American Quakers
Ohio Democrats
Opposition Party members of the United States House of Representatives from Ohio
Ohio Republicans
Republican Party members of the United States House of Representatives
Mayors of Toledo, Ohio
American abolitionists
American suffragists
Male feminists
19th-century American politicians
Burials at Mount Hope Cemetery (Rochester)
Quaker abolitionists
Quaker feminists